Laffitte is a surname of French origin. Notable people with that name include:
Hector Manuel Laffitte (born 1934), former United States federal judge
Jacques Laffitte (17671844), French banker and politician
 Cabinet of Jacques Laffitte, a French government ministry of 183031
Jean Laffitte (born 1952), French official in the Roman Catholic church
Louis Laffitte, pseudonym of French novelist Jean-Louis Curtis (191795)
Pierre Laffitte (18231903), French  positivist

Other uses 
 Maisons-Laffitte, a commune in the Yvelines department in the Île-de-France region in north-central France
 Gare de Maisons-Laffitte, a railway station
 Maisons-Laffitte Racecourse
 Critérium de Maisons-Laffitte, a horse race
 La Coupe de Maisons-Laffitte, a horse race
Rue Laffitte, a street in Paris

See also
Jacques Laffite (born 1943), French Formula One racing driver active 197486
 

French-language surnames